24/7 is the title of the seventh studio album by GusGus. The album was released on 14 September 2009 by the German label Kompakt, which had delayed the record from its originally announced release date of 6 July 2009. The first single was "Add This Song", released on 22 June 2009, with remixes from Lopazz & Zarook, Gluteus Maximus, Patrick Chardronnet and Klovn. Beginning on 4 September 2009, a full album leak started spreading on various Internet blogs and forums. On 19 October 2009, "Thin Ice" was released as the second single.

Track listing

Singles

References 

2009 albums
GusGus albums